The Copyright Remedy Clarification Act (CRCA) is a United States copyright law that attempted to abrogate sovereign immunity of states for copyright infringement.  The CRCA amended 17 USC 511(a):

Unconstitutionality 

The CRCA has been struck down as unconstitutional by the United States Supreme Court in Allen v. Cooper (March 23, 2020). 

The Supreme Court decision followed district and appellate courts in the 1st, 2nd, 4th, 5th, 6th, 9th, and 11th Circuits. The 11th Circuit did not strike down the CRCA but did not allow it to be used to avoid sovereign immunity on the facts that were before it. A case in the 9th Circuit settled before decision. Courts have generally followed the logic applied by the US Supreme Court in Seminole Tribe v. Florida, and applied in the patent context in Florida Prepaid v. College Savings Bank, 527 U.S. 627 (1999). In these cases the Court held that the Eleventh Amendment to the United States Constitution prohibits Congress from using its Article I powers to abrogate states' sovereign immunity (a holding that later Supreme Court cases such as Central Virginia Community College v. Katz have qualified), and that the Patent Remedy Clarification Act did not have a sufficient basis to meet Fourteenth Amendment requirements.  Although most courts have refused to enforce the CRCA, one district court upheld the Act in 2017 and the 4th Circuit Court of Appeals should rule on an appeal from that decision in mid to late 2018.

Several cases upheld the sovereign immunity of state universities in particular. Legal scholars Paul J. Heald and Michael Wells wrote that

Further, cases for copyright violation by university radio stations were also dismissed as the radio, funded mostly by the university, was found to enjoy the same immunity.

The CRCA attempt was repeated by Congress with the Intellectual Property Protection Restoration Act of 2001.

Allen v. Cooper

The North Carolina Legislature passed "Blackbeard's Law", N.C. Gen Stat §121-25(b), which stated, "All photographs, video recordings, or other documentary materials of a derelict vessel or shipwreck or its contents, relics, artifacts, or historic materials in the custody of any agency of North Carolina government or its subdivisions shall be a public record pursuant to Chapter 132 of the General Statutes." The state government of North Carolina accordingly uploaded videos of the wreck of the Queen Anne's Revenge to its website.

Nautilus Productions, the company documenting the recovery since 1998, filed suit in federal court over copyright violations.
The Supreme Court granted certiorari in the case in 2019.

On November 5, 2019 the United States Supreme Court heard oral arguments in Allen v. Cooper. On March 23, 2020, the Supreme Court of the United States issued an opinion in Allen v. Cooper, holding that Congress had no Constitutional authority to abrogate state sovereign immunity via the Copyright Remedy Clarification Act. In other words, the CRCA is unconstitutional. Congress failed to provide evidence to support the need to abrogate sovereign immunity.

The case had received broad participation. The American Library Association and others filed an amicus brief siding with the state, saying that "state-run libraries and archives have not abused state sovereign immunity; copyright holders have sufficient means of enforcing their rights against state-run libraries and archives; elimination of the sovereign immunity for copyright claims would endanger digital preservation efforts by state-run libraries and archives". Thirteen amici filed briefs in support of Allen, including the United States Chamber of Commerce, the Recording Industry Association of America, the Copyright Alliance, the Software and Information Industry Association, and the National Press Photographers Association.
Those briefs proposed various doctrines under which the CRCA could validly abrogate sovereign immunity and variously re-asserted and supported the reasons why Congress examined and enacted CRCA, claiming that Congress was fair in finding that states had abused immunity and that an alternative remedy was needed. The brief by APLU and AAU stated the opposite on all counts. 30 states also filed a brief in support of Cooper, denying that the states had ever given up their sovereign immunity by ratifying the Progress Clause or otherwise. The brief by a law professor stated that there was no copyright infringement in the first place, under de minimis and fair use.

Following the ruling, Senators Thom Tillis (R-North Carolina) and Patrick Leahy (D-Vermont), of the intellectual property subcommittee on the Senate Judiciary Committee, sent letters to the U.S. Copyright Office and the U.S. Patent and Trademark Office requesting a study detailing copyright infringements by state governments. The United States Copyright Office gave intellectual property owners suffering infringement by state entities until August 3, 2020 to publicly comment as part of this inquiry. In September of 2020 the U.S. Copyright Office began publishing comments where the copyright industry alleged hundreds of copyright violations by state entities across decades, while libraries and state entities denied the significance or intentionality of the alleged infringements. The subsequent report, issued on August 31, 2021 by the U.S. Copyright Office, referenced 130 copyright lawsuits filed against state entities and stated that "The Office..continues to believe that infringement by state entities is an issue worthy of congressional action."

Case law 
 Chavez v. Arte Publico Press, 204 F.3d 601 (5th Cir. 2000) 
 Salerno v. City University of New York, 191 F. Supp. 2d 352 (S.D.N.Y. 2001)
 Hairston v. North Carolina Agricultural and Technical State University, 2005 WL 2136923 (M.D.N.C. 2005)
 De Romero v. Institute of Puerto Rican Culture, 466 F. Supp. 2d 410 (D.P.R. 2006) 
 Marketing Information Masters v. The Trustees of the California State University, 522 F.Supp. 2d 1088 (S.D. Cal. 2008)
 Romero v. California Dept. of Transportation, 2009 WL 650629 (C.D. Cal. 2009)
 Jacobs v. Memphis Convention and Visitors Bureau, 710 F. Supp. 2d 663 (W.D. Tenn. 2010) 
 Parker v. Dufreshne, 2010 U.S. Dist. LEXIS 64481 (W.D. La. 2010)
 Whipple v. Utah, 2011 WL 4368568 (D. Utah 2011) 
 National Association of Boards of Pharmacy v. University of Georgia (11th Cir. 2011) – says CRCA could be justified by 14th Amendment but the case before it did not present a factually sufficient due process claim.
 Reiner v. Saginaw Valley State University et al (Thomas Canale), E.D. Mich. March 15, 2018 (following other circuits in not entertaining a CRCA claim) 
 Coyle v. University of Kentucky, 2. F. Supp. 3d 1014 (E.D. Ky. March 4, 2014) 
 Issaenko v. University of Minnesota, 57 F.Supp. 3d 985 (D. Minn. 2014)
 Philpot v. WUIS/University of Illinois Springfield, S.D. Ind. Aug. 25, 2015.
 Campinha-Bacote v. Regents of the University of Michigan, 2016 U.S. Dist. LEXIS 5958 (S.D. Ohio Jan. 19, 2016)
 American Shooting Center, Inc. v. Sefcor Int'l, 2016 U.S. Dist. LEXIS 96111 (S.D. Cal. July 22, 2016)
 Alisa Wolf v. Oakland University, E.D. Mich. Dec. 5, 2016 (finding Chavez and Jacobs to be "highly persuasive")
 Nettleman III v. Florida Atlantic University, S.D. Fla. Jan. 5, 2017 (finding plaintiff did not state a complaint under the CRCA sufficient to abrogate state immunity, and noting the 5th Circuit's Chavez holding CRCA to be unconstitutional)
 Bell v. Indiana University (S.D. Ind. March 9, 2018)
 Allen v. Cooper, (U.S. Supreme Court March 23, 2020)

References

External links
SCOTUS considers ‘Blackbeard’s Law’ in shipwreck copyright suit, World Intellectual Property Review
Justices pillage state arguments for sovereign immunity for copyright infringement, SCOTUS Blog
Allen v. Cooper: Suing States for IP Infringement Patently-O
Blackbeard’s Revenge: Sovereign Immunity and Copyright, Plagiarism Today
How Blackbeard’s ship and a diver with an ‘iron hand’ ended up at the Supreme Court, Charlotte Observer
Episode 955: Pirate Videos, Planet Money, NPR
Sovereign Immunity Study: Notice and Request for Public Comment, U.S. Copyright Office
Sovereign Immunity Study: Comments U.S. Copyright Office
Holding States Accountable for Copyright Piracy Regulatory Transparency Project
Copyright and State Sovereign Immunity, U.S. Copyright Office

See also
Eleventh Amendment to the United States Constitution
Florida Prepaid Postsecondary Education Expense Board v. College Savings Bank

1990 in American law
United States federal copyright legislation
101st United States Congress
United States Eleventh Amendment case law